The 2023 Leeds City Council election is scheduled to take place on Thursday 4 May 2023 to elect members of Leeds City Council in England. It will be held on the same day as other local elections across the United Kingdom.

As per the election cycle, one third of the council's 99 seats are to be contested.

Election summary

Councillors not standing for re-election 

Incumbent Labour councillor, Julie Heselwood, has been selected to stand in Weetwood ward. She will not stand for re-election in Bramley and Stanningley.

Notes

References 

Leeds City Council elections
Leeds